Stéphane Tritz (born 25 February 1987) is a French professional footballer who plays as a right back for Wormatia Worms.

References

Stéphane Tritz profile at foot-national.com

1987 births
Living people
Footballers from Strasbourg
French people of German descent
French footballers
Association football defenders
RC Strasbourg Alsace players
SR Colmar players
Rodez AF players
Tours FC players
ASC Oțelul Galați players
Stade Brestois 29 players
SC Preußen Münster players
Wormatia Worms players
Ligue 2 players
Liga I players
3. Liga players
French expatriate footballers
Expatriate footballers in Romania
French expatriate sportspeople in Romania